Spilonota trilithopa is a species of moth of the  family Tortricidae. It is found in Yunnan, China.

References

Moths described in 1937
Eucosmini